Twin Valley South High School is a public high school in West Alexandria, Ohio.  It is the only high school in the Twin Valley Community Local School District. Their colors are scarlet and gray, and are known as the Panthers. Their main rival is Tri-County High School, located in Lewisburg, Ohio.

Athletics
School sports include football, cross country, golf, boys and girls basketball, baseball, softball, volleyball, wrestling, co-ed track, and marching band.

Ohio High School Athletic Association State Championships
 Boys Track and Field – 1959* 
 * Title won by West Alexandria High School prior to consolidation into Twin Valley South.

References

High schools in Preble County, Ohio
Public high schools in Ohio